Thelairodes is a genus of parasitic flies in the family Tachinidae.

Species
Thelairodes lavinia Curran, 1934
Thelairodes pallidus Wulp, 1891
Thelairodes paradoxicus (Townsend, 1917)
Thelairodes vittigerus (Bigot, 1889)

References

Diptera of South America
Diptera of North America
Dexiinae
Tachinidae genera
Taxa named by Frederik Maurits van der Wulp